Fulbrook could be:

Places in England
Fulbrook, Buckinghamshire
Fulbrook, Oxfordshire
Fulbrook, Warwickshire

Places in the United States
Fulbrook, Texas

Other
Fulbrook Middle School in Bedfordshire, England
Fulbrook School in Surrey, England